KIBS (100.7 FM) is a radio station broadcasting a country music format. Licensed to Bishop, California, United States, the station is currently owned by Great Country Broadcasting, Inc.

History
Originally KIBS-FM went on the air on 1967 but went off the air in 1969. John Young bought KIBS-AM in 1985 and soon after Bought KIOQ-FM in Bishop, CA. He then switched the KIBS call letters to the FM dial at 100.7.

References

External links

IBS
Country radio stations in the United States
Bishop, California
Inyo County, California
1974 establishments in California
Radio stations established in 1974